Pomigacze  is a village in the administrative district of Gmina Turośń Kościelna, within Białystok County, Podlaskie Voivodeship, in north-eastern Poland.

The village has a population of 350.

References

Villages in Białystok County